A World Out of Time is a science fiction novel by Larry Niven and published in 1976. It is set outside the Known Space universe of many of Niven's stories, but is otherwise fairly representative of his 1970s hard science fiction novels. The main part of the novel was originally serialized in Galaxy magazine as "Children of the State"; another  part was originally published as the short story "Rammer".  A World Out of Time placed fifth in the annual Locus Poll in 1977.

Plot summary 
Jerome Branch Corbell has incurable cancer and is cryogenically frozen in the year 1970 in the faint hope of a future cure. His body is revived in 2190 by an oppressive, totalitarian global government called "The State". His personality and memories are extracted (destroying his body in the process) and transferred into the body of a mindwiped criminal. After awakening, he is continually evaluated by Peerssa, a "checker", who has to decide whether he is worth keeping. With the threat of his own mindwiping looming, Corbell works hard to pass the various tests.

Peerssa decides that Corbell is a loner and born tourist, making him an ideal candidate to pilot a one-man Bussard ramjet, finding and seeding suitable planets as the first step to terraforming them. Discovering it is a one-way trip and disgusted with the State's treatment of him as an expendable commodity, Corbell hijacks the ship and takes it to the center of the galaxy. (It was at this point that the original short story ended.)

Peerssa fails to talk him out of it. Peerssa and The State resort to subterfuge; an artificial intelligence program based on Peerssa's personality is secretly transferred into the ship's computer using the link with Earth. Though the Peerssa AI opposes the detour, it cannot disobey Corbell's direct orders.

After a lengthy journey (including a close approach to the super-massive black hole at the galactic axis), possible only due to the suspended animation devices on board, Corbell returns to the solar system. Although only about 150 years have passed on the ship, three million years have elapsed on Earth, due to relativistic time dilation. At first, he is confused and initially believes they might have come to the wrong system because it has changed considerably; the Sun has apparently evolved into a red giant and what might be Earth is in orbit around a super-hot Jupiter. Having followed a message clearly from humans (warning not to visit other human-occupied star systems), and being too old to survive going anywhere else, Corbell puts the ship into orbit around what is surely the Earth.

The Earth's climate has changed, especially its surface temperature; the poles are now temperate, while the former temperate zones reach temperatures of over 50 degrees Celsius (120+ degrees Fahrenheit). The Earth's axial tilt is still 23.5 degrees so the poles experience 6 years of night and 6 years of day. Almost all remaining life on Earth has adapted to live in Antarctica. Elsewhere life is extinct except for some evidence of biological activity in the Himalayan mountains.

When Corbell lands (in a modified biological probe), he is captured by Mirelly-Lyra,  who is also a returned star ship pilot and refugee from the past—though from Corbell's (and Peerssa's) future. She explains that the human species has fragmented; it is dominated by a race of immortal, permanently pre-adolescent males (the Boys), who are created by advanced medical techniques. Some time in the past, they had defeated the equally immortal (though now extinct) Girls, in the ultimate war of the sexes. The Boys have enslaved the dikta, who are unmodified humans (though they have evolved somewhat), from whom they take boys to replenish their ranks.

Mirelly-Lyra had initially been a captive toy of the Girls. After their downfall, she obsessively searched in vain for the lost adult-immortality treatment, extending her life as much as possible using her own drugs and a form of zero-time stasis while waiting for another returning star ship and potential help. Because she could not stop the aging process entirely, she is an old crone by the time she finds Corbell. He manages to escape from her, only to be caught by the Boys, who take him to a dikta settlement. Corbell finds out that the solar system was engineered into its new configuration by the Girls in order to move the Earth to a habitable distance from the enlarged Sun (caused by war with colonies), and that an orbital error caused Jupiter to overheat and triggered the war that killed the Girls. With Gording, the dikta leader, Corbell escapes once more.

Eventually, Corbell discovers the adult-immortality treatment, albeit by accident and only realizing it after he himself has been exposed to it. He uses it to enlist Mirelly-Lyra's help, which in turn finally gives him full control of his ship's technology (the hostile Peerssa has decided that the woman is the last survivor of the State and will only obey her). The planet Uranus has been discovered to have been maneuvered to pass by the Earth and adjust its orbit by Peerssa the AI. Corbell arranges for the Earth's distance from the super-heated Jupiter to be adjusted by Peersa to lower the Earth's temperature without destroying the plants and animals that have adapted to the extreme conditions.

As the novel closes, he is plotting to liberate the dikta and enable them to regain control of their own destiny.

Literary significance and reception 

The New York Times reviewer Gerald Jonas wrote that, in a novel filled with wonders, "Niven describes everything in the toneless accents of a tour guide on a fall foliage caravan. . . . after a while, the wonders begin to blur together [and] the reader begins to yearn for less matter and more art."  Jerry L. Parsons in his review for the Library Journal said that A World Out of Time was reminiscent in parts of 2001: A Space Odyssey and To Your Scattered Bodies Go. He wrote, "a wonderfully escapist adventure, this story has a minimum of character development and description, but a maximum of excitement."

Geoff Ryman has described A World Out of Time as one of Niven's "hardest" works, but went on to specify that many of the concepts Niven used as plot points were "disintegrated by later research".

Robert Silverberg reviewed World unfavorably, terming it a "rambling, loose-jointed novel that seems to have assembled itself out of the handiest pieces in the heap while its author's attention was elsewhere." Richard A. Lupoff was similarly critical, saying Niven "starts out like a Saturn V and all too soon fizzles like a Vanguard. . . . this is either a novel that begins well and then goes dreadfully wrong or a cobbling together of several novelettes the first of which is a beauty and the others of which are stinkers."

Awards and nominations 

A World Out of Time was a nominee for the following awards:

 1977 Locus Award in the Novel category (5th Place)
 1977 Ditmar Award in the international science fiction category

Connections to other Niven works
The story does not take place in Niven's Known Space. It does share the same setting as two of his other novels, The Integral Trees (1983) and The Smoke Ring (1987) as well as the short story "The Kiteman". All three novels feature the totalitarian interplanetary State, "corpsicle" personality transfers into mind-wiped criminals without civil rights, police-like enforcers called "checkers," and a computer artificial intelligence personality in charge of a ramship expedition that seeds life in other systems to prepare them for human colonization.

Literary reference
The protagonist's name is a play on that of the author James Branch Cabell, whom Niven also mentions in some of his other writing.

See also
The Wandering Earth, a Chinese film and novel that also features an interaction between the Earth and Jupiter in an attempt to escape the Sun's death

References

External links 
 
 A World Out of Time at Worlds Without End

1976 American novels
1976 science fiction novels
American science fiction novels
Novels by Larry Niven
Dying Earth (genre)
Novels about time travel
Novels about impact events
Novels first published in serial form
Works originally published in Galaxy Science Fiction
Hard science fiction
Cryonics in fiction
Fiction set on Uranus
Holt, Rinehart and Winston books